The 2003–04 Michigan Wolverines men's basketball team represented the University of Michigan in intercollegiate college basketball during the 2003–04 NCAA Division I men's basketball season.  The team played its home games in the Crisler Arena in Ann Arbor, Michigan, and was a member of the Big Ten Conference.  Under the direction of head coach Tommy Amaker, the team finished tied for fifth in the Big Ten Conference.  The team earned a fifth place seed and advanced to the semifinals of the 2004 Big Ten Conference men's basketball tournament.  The team won the 2004 National Invitation Tournament. The team was unranked for all eighteen weeks of Associated Press Top Twenty-Five Poll, and it also ended the season unranked in the final USA Today/CNN Poll. The team had a 1–2 record against ranked opponents, with the lone victory coming against #12 Wisconsin 71–59 on February 22 at Crisler Arena.

Colin Dill and J. C. Mathis served as team co-captains, and Lester Abram and Bernard Robinson, Jr. shared team MVP honors.  The team's leading scorers were Daniel Horton (415 points), Bernard Robinson, Jr. (411 points) and Lester Abram (405 points).  The leading rebounders were Robinson (194), Courtney Sims (161) and Graham Brown (139).

Courtney Sims won the Big Ten Conference statistical championship for blocked shots with a 2.00 average in all games. The team led the conference in rebounding margin with a 3.4 average margin in conference games as well as blocked shots with a 4.31 team average in conference games.

In the 2004 Big Ten Conference men's basketball tournament at the Conseco Fieldhouse from March 11–14, Michigan was seeded fifth and earned a first round bye. Then, in the second round they defeated number 4 Iowa79–70 before being defeated by number 1 Illinois 74–60.

On March 16, 2004, Michigan defeated  65–64 at Crisler Arena in the first round of the 2004 National Invitation Tournament. Then, Michigan defeated  63–52 and  88–73 on March 22 and March 24 at Crisler Arena, respectively.  At the final four in New York City at Madison Square Garden, the team defeated  78–53 in the semifinals on March 30 and  62–55 to win the championship on April 1.

Regular season

National Invitation tournament
First Round
Michigan 65, Missouri 64
Second Round
Michigan 63, Oklahoma 52
Quarterfinal
Michigan 88, Hawaii 73
Semifinal
Michigan 78, Oregon 53 
Final
Michigan 62, Rutgers 55

Roster

Statistics
The team posted the following statistics:

Awards and honors
Daniel Horton, NIT Most Valuable Player

Team players drafted into the NBA

See also
Michigan Wolverines men's basketball
2004 National Invitation Tournament
NIT all-time team records
NIT bids by school and conference
NIT championships and semifinal appearances

References

External links
stats @ ESPN

Michigan Wolverines men's basketball seasons
Michigan
National Invitation Tournament championship seasons
Michigan
Michigan
Michigan